Toyah! Toyah! Toyah! is a live album by the English new wave band Toyah, fronted by Toyah Willcox, released in 1980 by Safari Records.

Background 
The album was recorded on 17 June 1980 at the Lafayette Club in Wolverhampton, using the Rolling Stones Mobile Studio. The concert was also filmed by ATV as part of a TV documentary about the band and its eponymous singer. It aired on 18 December 1980. A live version of "Danced" was released as a single at the end of 1980 to promote the album. Toyah! Toyah! Toyah! reached number 22 on the UK Albums Chart and number 3 on the UK Independent Albums Chart, and was subsequently certified silver in the UK in 1981 for selling more than 60,000 copies.

The album saw its first CD release in 1990 on the Great Expectations label. A new remastered version was released on 30 October 2006 via Cherry Red Records. This expanded edition features extra live tracks from 1980 and from the 1982 The Changeling tour. The latter tracks include those cut from the abridged CD release of Warrior Rock: Toyah on Tour – albeit taken from a different concert of the same tour. Six of the eight bonus tracks are previously unreleased. The new edition includes an introductory note from Toyah Willcox and a sleevenote by her archivist Craig Astley, in addition to rare live photographs. In May 2022, the album was re-released by Cherry Red Records, adding four live tracks previously cut from the album, and a DVD with the 1980 ATV documentary.

Track listing

Original release

2022 expanded deluxe edition

Personnel 
Band members
 Toyah Willcox – vocals & noises
 Joel Bogen – guitar
 Peter Bush – keyboards
 Charlie Francis – bass
 Steve Bray – drums
 Phil Spalding – bass (1982 material only)
 Keith Hale – keyboards (1982 material only)
 Simon Phillips – drums (1982 material only)

Production
Nick Tauber – producer, mixing
Phil Harding – engineer

Charts

Certifications

References

External links 
 Official audio stream on YouTube
 The official Toyah website

1980 live albums
Toyah (band) albums